Qaraməmmədli is a village and municipality in the Barda Rayon of Azerbaijan. It has a population of 368.

References

Populated places in Barda District